The 1954 VFL Grand Final was an Australian rules football game contested between the Footscray Football Club and Melbourne Football Club, held at the Melbourne Cricket Ground on 25 September 1954. It was the 57th annual Grand Final of the Victorian Football League (VFL), staged to determine the premiers for the 1954 VFL season.

The match
The match, attended by 80,897 spectators, was won by Footscray by 51 points, marking that club's first VFL premiership; it had won 9 premierships in the Victorian Football Association (VFA) before entering the VFL in 1925.

Footscray led by 29 points at quarter-time and were comfortably in front for the rest of the game. Jack Collins kicked 7 goals for the match and John Kerr had 32 disposals.

The teams

Umpire – Jack McMurray Jr.

Statistics

Score

Goalkickers

See also
 1954 VFL season
 2021 AFL Grand Final

External links
 Fullpointsfooty article on grand final
 

VFL/AFL Grand Finals
Grand
Western Bulldogs
Melbourne Football Club
September 1954 sports events in Australia